Methylorubrum aminovorans  is a bacterium from the genus Methylorubrum which has been isolated from soil.

References

Further reading

External links
Type strain of Methylobacterium aminovorans at BacDive -  the Bacterial Diversity Metadatabase

Hyphomicrobiales
Bacteria described in 1993